"Go to Hell" is the twelfth and penultimate episode of the third season of the anthology television series American Horror Story, which premiered on January 22, 2014, on the cable network FX. The episode was written by Jessica Sharzer and directed by Alfonso Gomez-Rejon.

With Fiona (Jessica Lange)'s deteriorating health, the girls show new powers as Queenie (Gabourey Sidibe) searches for Marie Laveau (Angela Bassett). Angela Bassett, Gabourey Sidibe, and Danny Huston guest star as Marie Laveau, Queenie, and the Axeman, respectively. This episode is rated TV-MA (LV).

Plot
Fiona shows Queenie a silent movie about the Seven Wonders (seven acts of magic a witch must demonstrate to be labeled the Supreme), which leads her to schedule Queenie's test of the Seven Wonders. Queenie says she considers Fiona's action as another desperate attempt to kill the Supreme. Fiona insists she wants to enjoy her last weeks of life peacefully.

After successfully returning from her own personal version of hell, Queenie convinces Papa Legba to take away Laveau. Meanwhile, Madame LaLaurie is working as a tour guide in her own house, lying about her history after attacking the previous guide. Queenie arrives and offers to help her, but she refuses so Queenie stabs her to death. Papa Legba orders the deceased Laveau to torture LaLaurie's daughters for all eternity.

At the Academy, Cordelia experiences a futuristic vision about the Coven, in which everyone (including herself) has been killed by Fiona as she maintains her position as Supreme.

Cordelia uses her sight to see the Axeman waiting for Fiona to arrive at the motel room. After she arrives, he confronts Fiona about the passport. After informing him of her plan to kill her successor and retain her youth, the Axeman hacks Fiona to death.

Back at the Academy, the witches execute the Axeman for his crimes against the Coven. The Coven hangs Fiona's portrait and Cordelia informs the girls they will all be undertaking the tests of the Seven Wonders.

Reception
Rotten Tomatoes reports a 62% approval rating, based on 13 reviews. The critical consensus reads, ""Go to Hell" presents a microcosm of Coven's flaws with a crowded episode whose messy narrative crowds out an effective surprise for a leading character." Matt Fowler from IGN gave the episode a rating of 7.9, adding that, ""Go to Hell" was a more focused episode, with a lot of driving action. It sounded off a few sour notes here and there, but in the end parts of it felt like a season finale." Emily VanDerWerff of The A.V. Club rated the episode a D+, stating, ""Go to Hell" kills off Coven older generation in its entirety, turning things over to the next generation, and I could not give two shits about it." He added, "By far the worst thing any TV show can be is boring, and that goes doubly for a Ryan Murphy and Brad Falchuk show. But in "Go to Hell", even the outrageous stuff feels rote."

The episode received a 1.8 18–49 ratings share and was watched by 3.36 million viewers in its original American broadcast, a decrease from the previous episode.

References

External links

 
 "Go to Hell" at TV Guide.com

2014 American television episodes
American Horror Story: Coven episodes
Television episodes set in hell